Goodenia scapigera, commonly known as white goodenia, is a species of flowering plant in the family Goodeniaceae and is endemic to the south-west of Western Australia. It is an erect, perennial herb or shrub with linear to narrow egg-shaped leaves clustered near the ends of the stems, and thyrses of white flowers with purplish spots.

Description

Taxonomy and naming
Goodenia scapigera was first formally described in 1810 by Robert Brown in his Prodromus Florae Novae Hollandiae et Insulae Van Diemen. The specific epithet (scapigera) means "bearing a flower stalk".

In 2000, Leigh William Sage described two subspecies and the names are accepted by the Australian Plant Census:

Distribution and habitat
This goodenia usually grows in sandy soil in woodland or heath and is widespread in the Avon Wheatbelt, Coolgardie, Esperance Plains, Jarrah Forest, Mallee and Swan Coastal Plain biogeographic regions in the south west of Western Australia. Subspecies graniticola has a more restricted distribution, growing in heath in granitic soil near Peak Charles National Park.

Conservation status
Goodenia scapigera subsp. scapigera is classified as "not threatened" by the Western Australian Government Department of Parks and Wildlife, but subsp. graniticola is classified as "Priority Two" by the Western Australian Government Department of Parks and Wildlife meaning that it is poorly known and from only one or a few locations.

References

scapigera
Eudicots of Western Australia
Plants described in 1810
Taxa named by Robert Brown (botanist, born 1773)
Endemic flora of Australia